Independiente Santa Fe is an association football club based in Bogotá, that competes in the Categoría Primera A, the top level football league in Colombia. Santa Fe was founded on February 28, 1941, and played its first league match on 15 August 1948, in a 2–2 draw with Deportes Caldas. As of 2013, Santa Fe is one of the teams never to have been relegated from the top level of Colombian football.

The club has won the Categoría Primera A 8 times, the Copa Colombia 2 times and the Colombian Superliga 2 times. The next table details the club's achievements since its formation in 1941.

List of managers

References

 
Independiente